Ada Municipal Airport  is two miles north of Ada, in Pontotoc County, Oklahoma.

Most U.S. airports use the same three-letter location identifier for the FAA and IATA, but Ada Municipal Airport is ADH to the FAA and ADT to the IATA (which assigned ADH to Aldan Airport in Aldan, Russia).

Scheduled service at Ada from 1950 to 1963 was first  in Beechcraft Bonanzas, then Douglas DC-3's, operated by Central Airlines

Facilities
(946 x 15 m).

In the year ending September 12, 2005 the airport had 12,250 aircraft operations, average 33 per day: 98% general aviation and 2% military. 48 aircraft are based at the airport: 83% single engine, 10% multi-engine and 6% jet.

References

External links 
Aviation Photos: Ada Municipal (KADH) at Airliners.net

Airports in Oklahoma
Ada, Oklahoma